The Winter Sports Federation of Pakistan is the national governing body to develop and promote the sport of skiing in Pakistan.  The federation was formed in December 1990.

Affiliations
The Federation is affiliated with the Pakistan Olympic Association and is a member of its executive council. It is also a recognized body with the Pakistan Sports Board.
Internationally the federation is affiliated with the International Ski Federation and the Asian Ski Federation.

Affiliated bodies 
The following bodies are affiliated with federation:
 Punjab Winter Sports Association 
 Sindh Winter Sports Association 
 KPK Winter Sports Association 
 Balochistan Winter Sports Association 
 Gilgit Baltistan Winter Association 
 Islamabad Winter Association 
 Pakistan Army
 Pakistan Navy 
 Pakistan Air Force 
 Adventure Foundation of Pakistan 
 Alpine Club of Pakistan 
 Higher Education Commission of Pakistan
 Gilgit Baltistan Scouts
 NADRA
 PTCL
 PTDC
 ABN Ambro
 Citi Bank
 Roller & Cross Country Ski Club of Pakistan

External links
 Official Website

References

Sports governing bodies in Pakistan
Pakistan
Skiing in Pakistan
Sports organizations established in 1990
1990 establishments in Pakistan